Marcel Hensema (born 16 April 1970) is a Dutch film actor. He appeared in more than seventy films since 1993. In 2007 he won the Golden Calf for Best Actor for his role in the movie Wild Romance.

Selected filmography

References

External links
 

1970 births
Living people
Dutch male actors
Dutch male film actors
Golden Calf winners
People from Winschoten